The Nutmegs were a 1950s American doo wop vocal group from New Haven, Connecticut, United States. They are best known for their songs "Story Untold" and "Ship of Love," both released in 1955. Each single made the national R&B charts, with "Story Untold" reaching No. 2 and "Ship of Love" peaking at No. 13. The quintet was led by tenor Leroy Griffin and was signed to Herald Records.

References

External links
 The Nutmegs on stormyweather.de

Doo-wop groups